The Wuling Sunshine is a five- to eight-seater Microvan made by SGMW (SAIC-GM-Wuling), a Chinese joint venture of SAIC with Liuzhou Wuling Motors Co and the U.S. carmaker General Motors.

The first generation model was sold from 2002 and remains on sale till 2013, with a brief overlap with the second generation model which went on sale from 2012. The second generation model received a more upmarket variant called the Sunshine S and was launched in 2015.



First generation

The first generation Wuling Sunshine was launched in 2002, and sold until 2013. In 2011, 943,000 examples of the Sunshine were made, which made it the third best selling vehicle in the world. It was the best selling vehicle in China in 2010, 2011, 2012 and 2013.

A different model, known as the Wuling Hongtu in China, is also sold as the "Wuling Sunshine" in Singapore.

Specifications
The Wuling Sunshine is available with a range of petrol engines, with power outputs that vary from 34.7 to 63 kW (50-84 SAE HP), which consume between 6.8 and 7.8 L/100 km. The engine is mid-mounted, and drives the rear wheels via a five speed manual gearbox. Brakes are hydraulic, with discs in front and drums at the rear, and steering is of the rack and pinion type.

The most basic version has two, rather than three rows of seats. Standard equipment on all versions is basic: air conditioning is optional, and windows are manually operated. Safety equipment is limited to seatbelts on the first two rows of seats.

There is a long wheel base version of the Wuling Sunshine that is 3995mm long, with a wheelbase of 2750mm, and it has a dry weight between 1010 and 1030 kg.

Second generation

A more recently developed, and slightly more expensive model called the new Wuling Sunshine (Wuling 6390, 新五菱之光). Both generations of models are sold side by side in China.

Powertrain
The second generation Wuling Sunshine or new Wuling Sunshine received an update for the 2013 model year, while the powertrain remains unchanged with the 1.0 liter engine developing ） and 85N·m mated to a 5-speed manual transmission.

Wuling Sunshine S

Just like the Wuling Rongguang S, the Wuling Sunshine S is a redesigned version of the base Wuling Sunshine. Exterior differentiation is obvious. Technical upgrades from the regular Sunshine is ABS and EBD.

Powertrain
The Wuling Sunshine S is powered by a 1.2 liter engine developing 82 hp and 115N·m mated to a 5-speed manual transmission.

Wuling Sunshine V
Despite being under the same series, the "V" version in Wuling's naming system always lead to a body style that's closer to a compact MPV, which is basically a completely different model.

References

Microvans
2000s cars
SAIC Motor vehicles
Wuling Motors
Cars of China